Joe McGrath (born in Dublin) is an association football coach who managed the New Zealand national team. McGrath first took charge of the New Zealand side in May 1997. New Zealand won three, drew three and lost six of his 12 games in charge.

He later coached Irish sides Bohemian F.C. and Kilkenny City.

During his spell at Oriel Park McGrath won the 1964-65 LFA President's Cup. He moved to Drumcondra F.C. in March 1966 making his debut against his former club. He played twice against Eintracht Frankfurt in the 1966–67 Inter-Cities Fairs Cup.

On 5 June 1966 at Dalymount Park McGrath played in the first ever Republic of Ireland U23 game. He was also an amateur international.

In November 1966 McGrath moved to Limerick F.C. and scored twice on his debut on the 20th.

A fully qualified UEFA coach, he took over as Irish Youths team coach in 1985 in succession to Liam Tuohy (footballer) and was later appointed FAI Director of Coaching.

He managed his son Derek McGrath (footballer) during his brief stay at Bohs and again at Kilkenny City. Derek also played for Shamrock Rovers amongst others in the League of Ireland and for the Republic of Ireland national under-19 football team and Republic of Ireland national under-21 football team.

References 

Year of birth missing (living people)
Living people
Association footballers from Dublin (city)
Republic of Ireland association footballers
Dundalk F.C. players
Drumcondra F.C. players
Limerick F.C. players
League of Ireland players
Republic of Ireland under-23 international footballers
League of Ireland managers
Republic of Ireland football managers
New Zealand national football team managers
Bohemian F.C. managers

Association football forwards